Movsesian or Movsesyan is an Armenian surname, meaning "son of Movses (Moses)". It may refer to
Alexander Movsesyan, Armenian playwright and novelist
Aris Movsesijan, Serbian screenwriter, movie director, writer blogger, politician and dentist
Gegard Mousasi, Iranian-Armenian MMA multichampion from The Netherlands.
Sergei Movsesian, Armenian chess Grandmaster
Sona Movsesian, American media personality and assistant to late night talk show host Conan O'Brien
Yura Movsisyan, Armenian-American retired footballer, one of Armenia's top goalscorers ever.

Armenian-language surnames
Patronymic surnames
Surnames from given names